The 2021 Première ligue de soccer du Québec féminine season was the fourth season of play for the Première ligue de soccer du Québec, a Division 3 women's soccer league in the Canadian soccer pyramid and the highest level of soccer based in the Canadian province of Québec.

A.S. Blainville was the defending champions from 2021. A.S. Blainville defended their title in the women's division and also won the inaugural women's League Cup.

Changes from 2020 and Changes due to pandemic 
The 2021 season will have its greatest number of participating teams with 10 teams in the female division. As with the 2020 PLSQ season, the start of the season was delayed due to the pandemic. In the women's division, Royal-Sélect de Beauport and Celtix du Haut-Richelieu join as new entries in the division. Pierrefonds FC will also debut for the first time, after their entry in 2020 was withdrawn due to the pandemic. In addition, CS Mont-Royal Outremont, CS Monteuil, and CS St-Hubert will also return from hiatus, after not playing in 2020 due to the COVID-19 pandemic. CS Fabrose became FC Laval following a merger with two other local clubs. The women's division will run from June 26 to August 8. The ten women's teams will play each team once, for a total of nine games. The top four teams in the standings will then take part in the PLSQ Cup for the first time, which will take place on August 13 and 15, at the Desjardins stadium in Laval.

Teams
Ten teams participated in the 2021 season. Each team played against every other team once. At the end of the season, the top four teams will qualify for the first edition of the League Cup (Coupe PLSQ).

Standings

Top scorers

Awards

Coupe PLSQ 

Semi-finals

Final

References

2021 in Canadian soccer
2021